Vierchniadzvinsk or Verkhnedvinsk, previously known as Drysa or Drissa until 1962, is a city in Vitebsk Region, Belarus. it is the administrative center of Verkhnyadzvinsk District.

Its population in 2009 was 7,600.

History 

Drissa is first mentioned in a chronicle of the year 1386. During the medieval period it formed part of the Principality of Polotsk, the Grand Duchy of Lithuania, and the Polish–Lithuanian Commonwealth. From 1801 it was the center of the Drissa uyezd of the Vitebsk Governorate, and during the War of 1812 it was the site of a fortified camp described by Leo Tolstoy in Book Three of War and Peace.

It became a raion center in 1924. During the Second World War it was occupied by Germany and most of the local population was massacred.

Footnotes

External links 
 
 

Cities in Belarus
Populated places in Vitebsk Region
Polotsk Voivodeship
Drissensky Uyezd
Holocaust locations in Belarus
Verkhnyadzvinsk District